is the twenty-fourth single by L'Arc-en-Ciel, released on March 3, 2004. It reached the number-one position and charted for 10 weeks on the Oricon chart. The single was certified Gold by RIAJ for shipment of 100,000 copies.

Track listing

References

2004 singles
L'Arc-en-Ciel songs
Oricon Weekly number-one singles
Songs written by Hyde (musician)
Songs written by Tetsuya (musician)
Ki/oon Music singles
2004 songs